This is the discography documenting albums and singles released by American singer N'Dea Davenport.

Albums

Singles

Featured singles

Additional information
The acid jazz label applied to The Brand New Heavies music was popularized by Eddie Piller and British record executive Gilles Peterson, perhaps in hopes that he could keep interest in the music on a par with the then-ubiquitous acid house music. The musical style was patterned after an admiration for 1970s funk ranging from James Brown to Rufus and the Average White Band. Peterson named his fledgling label Acid Jazz Records as well, and the Heavies recorded for this label in the United Kingdom.
Davenport recut the vocal track on "Never Stop", "Stay This Way" and "Dream Come True", after Jay Ella Ruth (the band's prior lead vocalist and co-writer) had ceased to be a member of the group, but preceding the major release of these recordings.
Davenport participated in sessions for both Malcolm McLaren's Waltz Darling and Madonna's I'm Breathless. The similarities between the videos (Deep in Vogue and Vogue) is a source for debate.
Davenport recorded Buddy Johnson's Save Your Love For Me, a song which has been covered many times and was a big hit for Nancy Wilson.
Davenport appeared in the music video for Breakfast Club's "Right on Track", singing back-up dressed as a singing hen in 1987.
Davenport appeared in the 1988 music video for Steve Winwood's "Roll with it" which was choreographed by Paula Abdul.
Davenport was the female backing vocalist on Gregg Alexander's 1989 debut album Michigan Rain. Future releases by Alexander would feature Danielle Brisebois as both female backing vocalist and co-writer, but at this point the two had not met.
Davenport appeared on 2 Hip 4 TV.
Davenport is also a drummer.
Davenport is a spinto soprano.

Notable collaborations
Davenport provides vocals on Michael Paulo's "One Passion."  Track: "If You Ever Change Your Mind." (1989)
Davenport provides vocals on Dead Prez's Turn off the Radio: The Mixtape Vol. 3: Pulse Of The People.
Davenport provides vocals on Dilouya's album Faithful Circus. Track "The Right Time".
Davenport provides vocals on DJ Krush's album 漸-Zen. Track: "With Grace".
Davenport provides vocals on the Everlast (House of Pain) album Eat at Whitey's. Tracks: "Love for Real" and "One and the Same".
Davenport provides vocals on Fred Everything's album Lost Together. Track: "Don't Nobody".
Davenport provides vocals on José Padilla's album Navigator. Track: "The Look of Love".
Davenport provides vocals on Natalie Merchant's album Ophelia. Track: "Break Your Heart".
Davenport provides vocals on Robbie Williams's "Lovelight", both a CD single and a track on the album Rudebox. Fellow Brand New Heavies member Andrew Levy provided bass.
Davenport provides vocals on Sly and Robbie's album Version Born.  Track: "For the Living".
Davenport provides vocals/writing on Return of the Headhunters!! with The Headhunters Band. Tracks: "Tip Toe", "Watch your back" (with Tre Hardson).
Davenport provides vocals/writing on Roger Sanchez's #1 European dance album First Contact. Track: "You can't change me" (with Armand Van Helden).
Davenport provides vocals/writing on Okino Shuya (Kyoto Jazz Massive)'s album Destiny. Tracks: "Deep into Sunshine", "Destiny", "Look ahead".
Davenport provides vocals/writing on DJ Kawasaki (Okino Yoshihiro/Kyoto Jazz Massive)'s album Black & Gold. Track: "Ain't No Mountain High Enough".
Davenport provides vocals on Gabor Deutsch's Maxi Single "Love With Desire" (2011)
Davenport provides vocals on Horse Meat Disco's album Love and Dancing.  Track: "Fight For Love" (2020)

References

External links
Official Brand New Heavies website

Discographies of American artists